This is a list of Ulster Unionist Party MPs.  It includes all Members of Parliament elected to the British House of Commons representing the Ulster Unionist Party or its forerunner, the Irish Unionist Party, since 1918.  Members of the European Parliament, the Northern Ireland House of Commons or the Northern Ireland Assembly are not listed.

MPs elected since 1918

1 Defected to the New Party.
2 Elected in 1974 for the Vanguard Unionist Progressive Party.
3 Defected to the Democratic Unionist Party.
4 Elected in 1956 as an Independent Unionist.
5 Left the party to become an Independent Unionist before forming the Ulster Popular Unionist Party.
6 Resigned from the party at the 1945 general election in protest at being subject to a reselection due to the retirement of Viscount Castlereagh, the other Ulster Unionist MP for the two member Down constituency and held his seat as an Independent Ulster Unionist.
7 Refused to follow the other Ulster Unionists in resigning the Conservative whip; later joined the Alliance Party of Northern Ireland.
8 Previously Conservative MP for Wolverhampton South West 1950–1974.
9 Left the party on 25 March 2010 to become an Independent Unionist.

MPs elected in 1918

William James Allen, Armagh North
Hugh Alfred Anderson, Londonderry North
Edward Mervyn Archdale, Fermanagh North
Thomas Watters Brown, Down North
Edward Carson, Belfast Duncairn
William Coote, Tyrone South
Charles Curtis Craig, Antrim South
James Craig, Down Mid
Herbert Dixon, Belfast Pottinger
Maurice Edward Dockrell, Dublin Rathmines
Denis Stanislaus Henry, Londonderry South
Peter Kerr Kerr-Smiley, Antrim North
William Arthur Lindsay, Belfast Cromac
James Rolston Lonsdale, Mid Armagh
Robert John Lynn, Belfast Woodvale
Robert Chaine Alexander McCalmont, Antrim East
Thomas Moles, Belfast Ormeau
Hugh O'Neill, Mid Antrim
David Douglas Reid, Down East
Arthur Warren Samuels, Dublin University
William Whitla, Queen's University of Belfast
Daniel Martin Wilson, West Down

Graphical representation 

Ulster Unionist
Ulster Unionist
Ulster Unionist Party
 List of MPs